The Southern Huntingdon County School District is a public rural school district based in the southeastern part of Huntingdon County, Pennsylvania in Three Springs,
Pennsylvania. The school district includes all of Three Springs Borough, Cassville Borough, Orbisonia Borough, Rockhill Furnace Borough, Saltillo Borough, Shade Gap Borough, and including the townships of Cass Township, Clay Township, Cromwell Township, Dublin Township, Springfield Township and Tell Township. The district encompasses approximately 221 square miles. According to 2000 federal census data, it serves a resident population of 8,030.

District History
The Southern Huntingdon County School System became effective on July 1, 1956, at which time all school boards of all twelve municipalities signed the district's Articles of Agreement. Two high Schools were consolidated (Orbisonia and Saltillo). Rockhill and Shade Gap Elementary Schools were the first two buildings constructed in 1956, followed by Spring Farms and Trough Creek Valley Elementary Schools in 1961, consolidating 55 one-room schoolhouses into only four buildings. Ground was broken on the High School on July 11, 1960, students occupied the facility on September 1, 1962, and dedication was held November 4 that year. In 2004, an renovtion/addition project was completed adding a middle school to the secondary campus. The final action was completed on July 1, 1966, officially forming the Southern Huntingdon County School District.

Superintendents

* Denotes Acting Superintendent

Schools
The Southern Huntingdon County School District operates one combined high school/middle school and three elementary schools. The school also sends students to the regional career & technology center, used by every school district in Huntingdon County.  The district administrative office is located on 10339 Pogue Road, Three Springs, PA 17264.

Middle / High School
 Southern Huntingdon County Middle/High School (Grades 6-12)10339 Pouge RoadThree Springs, Pennsylvania 17264

Elementary schools
There are three Elementary Schools, all Grades K-5

 Rockhill Elementary School510 Meadow StreetRockhill Furnace, Pennsylvania 17249
 Spring Farms Elementary School12075 Old Plank RoadThree Springs, Pennsylvania 17264
 Shade Gap Elementary School22251 Shade Valley RoadShade Gap, Pennsylvania 17255

Extracurriculars
The district offers a variety of clubs, activities and sports.

Athletics
 Baseball - Class AA
 Basketball - Class AA
 Girls Field Hockey - Class AA
 Football - Class AA
 Track and Field - Class AA
 Wrestling - Class AA

Career & Technology Centers
 Huntingdon County Career and Technology Center - Mill Creek - Grades 10-12

References

External links
 Southern Huntingdon County School District
 PIAA

School districts in Huntingdon County, Pennsylvania
School districts established in 1956